Lucullus may refer to:

People
 Licinius Lucullus, any man of the family Licinii Luculli;
 Lucius Licinius Lucullus (fl. 2nd century BC), a Roman consul in 151 BC, grandfather of the famous Lucullus;
 Lucius Licinius Lucullus (c.144 BC – ?), a Roman praetor in 104 BC, father of the famous Lucullus;
 Lucius Licinius Lucullus also known as just Lucullus (118 – 57/56 BC), a Roman consul in 74 BC, the Roman general in Third Mithridatic War;
 Marcus Terentius Varro Lucullus (c. 116 – 56 BC), a consul in 73 BC and proconsul of Macedonia, brother of the famous Lucullus;
 Sallustius Lucullus (died c. 89), a governor of Roman Britain during late 1st century;
 Willis Lucullus Palmer (1854–1912), an American politician and Mayor of Orlando (1891–1893);
 Lucullus Virgil McWhorter (1860–1944), an American farmer and frontiersman.

Arts and plays
 The Trial of Lucullus, a 1930s radio play by Bertolt Brecht;
 The Condemnation of Lucullus (Die Verurteilung des Lukullus), a 1950s opera by Paul Dessau.

Biology
 Svetovidovia lucullus, a cod-like fish in the family Moridae
 Papilio lucullus, synonym of Euphaedra ceres, a butterfly in the family Nymphalidae

Others
 Gardens of Lucullus (Horti Lucullani), the Persian garden laid out by Lucullus
 Lucullus, the dialogue by Cicero that was one of the books of the Academica